James Henderson Naismith  (born 26 July 1968) is Professor of Structural Biology at the University of Oxford, former Director of the Research Complex at Harwell and Director of the Rosalind Franklin Institute. He previously served as Bishop Wardlaw Professor of Chemical Biology at the University of St Andrews. He was a member of Council of the Royal Society (2021-2022). He is currently the Vice-Chair of Council of the European X-ray Free Electron Laser and Vice-President (non-clinical) of The Academy of Medical Sciences.

Education
Naismith was named after James VI and I. He was educated at Hamilton Grammar School. He went on to study at the University of Edinburgh where he received a first class Bachelor of Science degree in chemistry in 1989. He won a Carnegie Scholarship to work under the supervision of Bill Hunter, John R. Helliwell and David Garner at the University of Manchester where he received his PhD in 1992 for research into the chemical structure of Concanavalin A and Zinc aldolase. In 2016 he was awarded a Doctor of Science (DSc) by the University of St Andrews.

Career and research
Following his PhD, Naismith did postdoctoral research at the University of Texas Southwestern Medical Center as a NATO Fellow in the laboratory of Stephen Sprang. He was appointed a lecturer at the University of St Andrews in 1995, Reader in 1999 and a Professor in 2001. Naismith's research investigates: 

His research has been funded by the Biotechnology and Biological Sciences Research Council (BBSRC), the Engineering and Physical Sciences Research Council (EPSRC), the Medical Research Council (MRC), the Wellcome Trust and the European Union.

Awards and honours
Naismith was awarded the 2000 Dextra Carbohydrate award and the  2009 Jeremy Knowles Prize in Chemical Biology both from the Royal Society of Chemistry. Naismith was elected a Fellow of the Royal Society (FRS) in 2014. His nomination reads: 

Naismith was part of the team awarded a 2022 Royal Society of Chemistry Horizon Prize for their work on nanobodies against Covid19. Naismith is also Fellow of the Royal Society of Chemistry (FRSC), the Royal Society of Biology (FRSB), the Royal Society of Edinburgh (FRSE), the Academy of Medical Sciences, United Kingdom (FMedSci), an elected member of the European Molecular Biology Organization (EMBO), in 2016 was elected a Fellow of the American Association for the Advancement of Science (AAAS) and in 2022 elected a member of Academia Europaea (AE). His nomination for the Academy of Medical Sciences reads:

Personal life
Naismith is married to Rachel Middleton with whom he has one son and one daughter.

References

Living people
Fellows of the Royal Society
Academics of the University of St Andrews
Members of the European Molecular Biology Organization
Fellows of the Academy of Medical Sciences (United Kingdom)
Fellows of the Royal Society of Edinburgh
1968 births
British chemists
British biochemists